The Presidential Anti-Corruption Commission (PACC) was an anti-corruption government agency of the Philippines which existed during the administration of President Rodrigo Duterte.

History

President Rodrigo Duterte created the Presidential Anti-Corruption Commission (PACC) through Executive Order No. 43 which was signed on October 4, 2017. This was a response to Ombudsman Conchita Carpio-Morales, and her deputies Melchor Arthur Carandang and Rodolfo Elman pursuing a fact-finding investigation on Duterte's alleged illegal bank deposits worth at least  as stated by Senator Antonio Trillanes. Duterte earlier said he would create a commission to have Carpio-Morales and her deputies investigated for possible abuse of power. The PACC enables the President to conduct lifestyle checks and fact-finding on public officials and employees.

On  December 28, 2018, Duterte issued Executive Order No. 73 which mandates the PACC to recommend complaints of violation against the Anti-Red Tape Act to the Anti-Red Tape Authority.

In September 2021, the National Anti-Corruption Coordinating Council (NACC), a child agency under the PACC, was formed amidst the COVID-19 pandemic in the Philippines. The NACC launched the Project Kasangga: Aksyon Kontra Korapsyon, an initiative to improve the detection of anomalous transactions amidst scrutiny on the utilization of the government's funds for the pandemic response by the Duterte administration.

Duterte's successor, President Bongbong Marcos abolished the PACC through Executive Order No. 1 on June 30, 2022 as part of a reorganization of agencies under the Office of the President. The PACC's powers and function was transferred to the Office of the Deputy Executive Secretary for Legal Affairs, which shall make recommendations on matters requiring its actions to the Executive Secretary for approval of the President.

Chairpersons

References

2018 establishments in the Philippines
2022 disestablishments in the Philippines
Government agencies under the Office of the President of the Philippines
Presidency of Rodrigo Duterte
Establishments by Philippine executive order